South Street is an affluent residential street in Durham, England, on the banks of the River Wear. It overlooks the Durham Cathedral, a UNESCO World Heritage Site, and Durham Castle. It is best known for its terraced houses, many of which are Grade II listed buildings built in the Tudor Revival architecture and architecture of the modern era.
 
The street is situated in a conservation area and runs 0.5 km from Pimlico near Durham School to the Church of St Margaret of Antioch and Framwellgate Bridge. It is in walking distance from the Durham city centre.

History
Sir Walter Scott was so inspired by the South Street view of the Durham Cathedral that he wrote "Harold the Dauntless," a poem about Saxons and Vikings set in County Durham and published in 1817. The following lines from the poem are engraved into nearby Prebends Bridge:

References

Buildings and structures in Durham, England
Streets in England